United Nations Security Council Resolution 90 adopted unanimously on January 31, 1951, resolved to remove the item "Complaint of aggression upon the Republic of Korea" from the list of matters of which the council is seized.

See also
List of United Nations Security Council resolutions concerning North Korea
List of United Nations Security Council Resolutions 1 to 100 (1946–1953)

References
Text of the Resolution at undocs.org

External links
 

 0090
Korean War
 0090
 0090
January 1951 events